Pomponio Torelli (1539 – 9 April 1608) was Count of Montechiarugolo and a writer of prose, poetry and plays. He is principally remembered for his five tragedies.

Life
Pomponio Torelli was born in 1539 at Montechiarugolo near Parma, which until the creation of the Duchy of Parma in 1545 was in the Duchy of Milan. He was the third son of Paolo Torelli (1509 – 1545) and his second wife Beatrice Pico della Mirandola (died 1546), who was the great-niece of Giovanni Pico della Mirandola. In 1545 Torelli's father died and he succeeded at the age of six to the title of Count of Montechiarugolo; his mother died in the following year. He was tutored at home by Andrea Casali, then studied at Padova under Bernardino Tomitano and Francesco Robortello.

In 1566 he was knighted by the second Duke of Parma, Ottavio Farnese, and made ambassador to Flanders. In 1573 he married Isabella Bonelli, great-niece of pope Pius V and sister of cardinal Michele Bonelli. The third Duke of Parma, Alessandro Farnese, appointed Torelli tutor to his son Ranuccio Farnese, and entrusted him with diplomatic missions in Flanders and in Spain.

Under the nickname Il Perduto, "the lost one", Torelli was a leading figure in the Accademia degli Innominati, a society of learned and literary men founded in Parma on 13 June 1574, which ceased activity in 1608, the year of Torelli's death.

Pomponio Torelli died in Parma on 9 April 1608. A portrait of him by Cesare Aretusi was commissioned in 1602 by Giovan Battista Masi, who married Torelli's daughter Clelia in 1604 and who, with Torelli's son and heir Pio, was among those beheaded on 19 May 1612 for involvement in the Congiura dei feudatari, or "plot of the feudal lords", against Ranuccio Farnese. The painting is now in the Galleria Nazionale di Parma.

Works
Torelli wrote love poetry in the style of Petrarch; his Rime were published in 1575, with an expanded edition in 1586, and his Scherzi poetici in 1598. His six books of Carmina in Latin were printed in Parma in 1600. His Trattato del debito del cavaliere (1596) and Trattato delle passioni dell’animo contain his Neoplatonist philosophical discussions of affects, emotions and the duties of the knight. He is however principally remembered for his tragedies: La Merope was published in 1589, Il Tancredi in 1597, La Galatea in 1603, and La Vittoria, on Pietro della Vigna, and Il Polidoro both in 1605.

Editions
 Rime amorose del conte Pomponio Torelli detto il Perduto, nell'Academia de gli illustri signori Innominati di Parma. In Parma: appresso Seth Viotti, 1575
 Rime del conte Pomponio Torelli, nell'Academia de gli illustrissimi signori Innominati di Parma il Perduto. Di nuouo ristampate, & corrette, con aggiunta di molte compositioni, che non erano nella prima editione. In Parma: [Erasmo Viotti], 1586
 La Merope, tragedia del conte Pomponio Torello, detto nell'Academia de gli Innominati di Parma il Perduto. In Parma: appresso Erasmo Viotto, 1589 
 Trattato del debito del caualliero, di Pomponio Torelli. In Venetia: appresso Giouan Battista Ciotti senese, al segno dell'Aurora, 1596; another edition, In Parma: nella stamperia di Erasmo Viotti, 1596
 Il Tancredi, tragedia di Pomponio Torelli conte di Montechiarugolo, nell'Academia de' sig. Innominati di Parma il Perduto. In Parma: per Erasmo Viotti, 1597 
 Scherzi poetici dell'illustriss. s. Pomponio Torello. In Verona: appresso Girolamo Discepolo, 1598
 Pomponii Taurelli, Montisclariculi comitis, academici Innominati Parmensis Carminum libri sex. Parmae: ex typographia Erasmi Viotti, 1600
 La Galatea del conte Pomponio Torelli : nell'illustriss. Academia de gli Innominati il Perduto. In Parma : Nella stamperia di Erasmo Viotti, MDCIII [1603]
 La Vittoria, tragedia di Pomponio Torelli conte di Montechiarugolo, nell'Academia de' Sig. Innominati di Parma il Perduto. In Parma: Nella stamperia di Erasmo Viotti, 1605
 Il Polidoro, tragedia di Pomponio Torelli, conte di Montechiarugolo, nell'Academia de' Sig. Innominati di Parma il Perduto. In Parma: Nella stamperia di Erasmo Viotti, 1605.

References

Further reading
 Pietro Montorfani (2010) Uno specchio per i principi. Le tragedie di Pomponio Torelli (in Italian). Pisa: ETS, .
 Alessandro Bianchi, Nicola Catelli, Andrea Torre (2012) Il debito delle lettere: Pomponio Torelli e la cultura farnesiana di fine Cinquecento (in Italian). Milano: Unicopli, .
 

1539 births
1608 deaths
Italian male writers
Nobility from Parma
Pomponio
Writers from Parma